The Texican is a 1966 American Techniscope Western film produced and written by John C. Champion and directed by Lesley Selander.  It is a paella western remake of their 1948 film Panhandle adapted for the persona of Audie Murphy that featured Broderick Crawford as the heavy. The film was re-titled Ringo il Texano in Italy to coincide with the popularity of the Ringo Spaghetti Western film series.

Plot
The town of Rimrock, Arizona is run by political boss Luke Starr (Broderick Crawford). When one of Starr's henchmen wishes to escape from Starr he meets with the editor of the town newspaper, Roy Carlin (Víctor Vilanova), to ask for his help. Starr discovers the meeting and he and his loyal henchmen shoot both of them, spreading the story that the two killed each other in a gunfight.

Roy Carlin's brother Jess (Audie Murphy) is a former Texas sheriff now living in semi-retirement with his girlfriend in Mexico. He has a price on his head for unstated crimes committed in the United States but earns income and beats the boredom of his quiet life by capturing fugitive American criminals and turning them over to American lawmen who return them across the border.

When Jess finds out the story of his brother he renounces the quiet life to bring his brother's killer to justice, as he knows Roy never carried a firearm. On the way he is unsuccessfully ambushed by bounty hunters and has to escape without his saddle.

Stopping off at a ranch he thinks is unoccupied, he leaves money for a saddle but is held at gunpoint by the ranch owner Sandy (Luz Márquez). She changes her opinion on Jess after discovering he has left money as payment that is four times the value of the saddle.

Riding into Rimrock, Jess unsuccessfully tries to find out more about his brother's death. The new editor of the paper asks Jess to stay to eliminate Luke Starr and his band. Jess explains that in the past, when he was a sheriff in the same town where his brother was a newspaper editor, they cleaned up the town but found out the hard way that the men who replaced those they got rid of were much worse.

After fist and gun fights, Jess is finally able to establish proof of Luke's involvement in the killing when he finds a decorative concho that leather worker Sandy is able to identify as one that came off Luke's gun belt.

Cast

Production
Audie Murphy was one of the many stars who turned down Sergio Leone's A Fistful of Dollars because he recognised that the screenplay was an uncredited copy of Akira Kurosawa’s Yojimbo.  With Westerns being not only in demand but cheap to produce in Europe, the film crew travelled to Spain in September 1965 to shoot the film. Murphy recalled he had to perform his own stunts and “had to do everything myself except pack my own lunch”.

A third partner in the MCR (Murphy, Champion & SelandeR) Production company, Murphy had a large say in the making of the film. The team was to have made another film in Spain, Maverick Guns with Cesar Romero and Gary Crosby but it was never made.

Producer and writer John C. Champion, whose first film had been Panhandle, had made several Westerns in America and the Laramie Western series. After his Spanish venture, he moved to England and started Oakmont Productions to film war films for Mirisch Productions.  Lesley Selander finished his career directing Westerns for A.C. Lyles.

Notes

External links 
 
 The Texican at TCMDB
 
 
 The Texican at Audie Murphy Memorial Site

1966 films
Audie Murphy
Columbia Pictures films
Films directed by Lesley Selander
Spanish Western (genre) films
1966 Western (genre) films
Films shot in Spain
Spaghetti Western films
Films shot in Barcelona
Films scored by Nico Fidenco
1960s English-language films
American Western (genre) films
1960s American films
1960s Italian films